Rialto Unified School District is a school district in San Bernardino County, California, serving most of Rialto, sections of Colton, Fontana and San Bernardino and the unincorporated community of Lytle Creek. The Superintendent is Dr. Cuauhtémoc Avila. The president of the Board of Education is Edgar Montes.

The school district has about 26,485 students, 3,800 staff, and a budget of about $200 million.

History
The district's first schoolhouse, which opened in 1888, was a part of the Brooke School District. The Rialto school district was formed out of the Brooke district on April 9, 1891.

Holocaust writing assignment controversy
In 2014, the school district and its interim superintendent were criticized for introducing a writing assignment which asked students to argue that the Holocaust did not happen. This assignment was given to all 8th grade students. Students were provided with a very limited selection of sources, including material from a known Holocaust denial website, but were not allowed access to the internet or other materials that show that this material had been discredited.   A follow-up investigation by The San Bernardino Sun found that (contrary to the district's initial claims) at least 50 of the 2,000 students taking the test ended up concluding that the Holocaust did not occur.  The district has apologized and promised not to repeat the exercise, and also sent all the eighth graders to visit the Museum of Tolerance in Los Angeles, a museum known for its exhibits about the Holocaust.

Wrestling
On May 10, 2014 Kolb Middle School won the first ever championship for its district.  They beat Jehue Middle School, 36-34.

The undefeated 5-0 Cougars faced Jehue (4-1) on May 15, 2015. Kolb beat them again, by a blowout of 60-15.  They were the only school to score double digits on the Cougars all season.  The Cougars were the First team in the district to have an undefeated wrestling season, 6-0.

Elementary schools
 Levi Bemis Bobcats
 J. Calvin Boyd Bulldogs
 Merle S.Casey Cougars
 Sam V. Curtis Colts
 Helen L. Dollahan Dalmatians
 George H. Dunn Dolphins
 Dr. Edward gggM. Fitzgerald Foxes
 Dr. Ernest Garcia Grizzlies
 Lida M. Henry Hawks
 Elizabeth T. Hughbanks Huskies
 J. P. Kelley Koalas
 A. H. Morgan Mustangs
 Georgia F. Morris Mountain Lions
 W. A.Myers Dragons
 Lena M. Preston Panthers
 Samuel W. Simpson Seahawks
 W. J. C. Trapp Timberwolves
 Charlotte Nan Werner, opening July 2008

Middle schools
 Warren H. Frisbie Middle School Falcons
 William G. Jehue Middle School Jaguars
 Ben F. Kolb Middle School Cougars
 Ethel Kucera Middle School Coyotes
 Rialto Middle School Tigers

High schools
 Wilmer Amina Carter High School Lions
 Eisenhower High School Eagles
 Rialto High School Knights
 Dr. John Milor High School Mustangs
 Charles Zupanic High School

References

External links
 Rialto Unified School District
 Edna Herring retiring.
 The Board of Education Joint Statement(Archive). Rialto Unified School District. - This is about the Holocaust controversy.
 Klein, Karin. "The Holocaust mistake at Rialto schools is more than a glitch" (Opinion). Los Angeles Times. May 8, 2014.

School districts in San Bernardino County, California
Rialto, California
1891 establishments in California
School districts established in 1891